Stardust Memorial Park is a memorial park located in the Bonnybrook townland of Coolock, Dublin built to commemorate the lives of those who died during the Stardust fire at the Stardust night club in nearby Artane on 14 February 1981. The park was officially completed and opened on 18 September 1993 by the then Lord Mayor of Dublin, Tomás MacGiolla.  The park comprises 22 acres along the Santry River and the land was originally a 12th-century monastic site.

History and development
The cost of the park was in excess of £500,000 Irish pounds and was partly funded by the Irish government. The design was prepared in 1991, and work on-site commenced in February 1992 with a combination of contract work, direct labour and a community youth training project which was operating through FÁS, the state agency in charge of assisting citizens seeking employment. The major works were carried out by Dublin Corporation's Parks Department with input from various divisions. The park is enclosed with a mild steel railing on a plinth wall, and the entrances are defined by piers of limestone which are of a similar design to that used in the memorial. 8,050 trees were planted, most of which were 11 years old making them as old as the incident in 1981.

Memorial
The memorial represents a circular pool with a bronze sculpture of a dancing couple in the middle and the memorial was designed by the sculptor, Robin Buick. Water is pumped by 48 jets in the illuminated fountain which surrounds the sculpture. The fountain is enclosed by 48 fence panels, each panel representing a person lost in the tragedy.

Facilities
The park has a playground, an all-weather football pitch which has been renovated by the Dublin City Council in late 2015 and a garden terrace with seating. Various bridges are placed over the Santry River which runs directly through the park into a small lake in the middle where a small island is present which is the home to many birds including swans and ducks. There are various seating areas around the park, primarily facing the park for passers-by who want to feed the birds.

Refurbishment 
Beginning in early 2020, the park was refurbished ahead of the 40th anniversary of the Stardust nightclub fire by the means of thousands of bulbs being planted throughout the park. As well as this, the other works consisted of some trees being removed, a butterfly bank being added and new paths being created. Noting the park's association with anti-social behaviour, the Dublin City Council highlighted the issue and recognised that their first undertaking was to ensure that the users of the park felt secure. As well as the refurbishments, a dedicated gardener has been assigned to maintain the upkeep of the park. The memorial itself has been cleaned and restored to its former glory and two benches have been added near the memorial itself.

References

Coolock
Monuments and memorials in the Republic of Ireland
Parks in Dublin (city)
Protected areas established in 1993